Inquisitor adenicus is a species of sea snail, a marine gastropod mollusk in the family Pseudomelatomidae, the turrids and allies.

Description
The length of the species attains 33 mm, its diameter 10.3 mm.

Distribution
This marine species occurs in the Gulf of Aden

References

 Sysoev, A.V. (1996b) Deep-sea conoidean gastropods collected by the John Murray Expedition, 1933–34. Bulletin of the Natural History Museum of London, Zoology, 62, 1–30

External links
 
 Biolib.cz: Inquisitor adenicus

adenicus
Gastropods described in 1996